This is the discography of Austrian production duo Camo & Krooked.

Albums

Remix albums

EPs

Singles

Other single releases

Other songs and appearances

Remixes & Bootlegs

Produced songs

References

Discographies of Austrian artists